Pristina is the capital and largest city of Kosovo. It is the administrative center of the homonymous municipality and district.

In antiquity, the area of Pristina was part of the Dardanian kingdom. The heritage of the classical era is represented by the settlement of Ulpiana, which was considered as one of the most influential Roman cities in the Balkan Peninsula. After the Roman Empire was divided into a western and an eastern half, the area remained within the Byzantine Empire between the 5th and 9th centuries. In the middle of the 9th century, it was ceded to the First Bulgarian Empire, before falling again under Byzantine occupation in the early 11th century and then in the late 11th century to the Second Bulgarian Empire.

Pristina seems to have a small village before the late 15th century. It is first recorded in 1342 as a village during the era of John VI Kantakouzenos and about a century later in 1455 at the beginning of the Ottoman era it had a small population of 300 households. In the following century, Pristina became an important mining and trading center due to its strategic position near the rich mining town of Novo Brdo. The city was known for its trade fairs and items, such as goatskin and goat hair as well as gunpowder. The first mosque in Pristina was built in the late 14th century while under Serbian rule.

Pristina is the capital and the economic, financial, political and trade center of Kosovo, due to its location in the center of the country. It is the seat of power of the Government of Kosovo, the residences for work of the President and Prime Minister of Kosovo, and the Parliament of Kosovo. Pristina is also the most important transportation junction of Kosovo for air, rail, and roads. Pristina International Airport is the largest airport of the country and among the largest in the region. A range of expressways and motorways, such as the R 6 and R 7, radiate out the city and connect it to Albania and North Macedonia.

Etymology 
The origin of the name of the city is unknown. Eric P. Hamp connected the word with an Indo-European derivative *pṛ-tu- (ford) + *stein (cognate to English stone) which in Proto-Albanian, spoken in the region before the reign of Roman Emperor Trajan (1st-2nd century CE) produced Pristina. Thus the name in the pre-Slavic migrations era would mean in the local Albanian variety "ford-stone" (cf. Stanford).

Ernst Eichler suggests a connection with the Emperor Primus Justinianus ("Justinian the First") who is thought to have built the town of Pristina. He speculates that the toponym Pristina is a composition of his name.

Marko Snoj proposes the derivation from a Slavic form *Prišьčь, a possessive adjective from the personal name *Prišьkъ, (preserved in the Kajkavian surname Prišek, in the Old Polish personal name Parzyszek, and in the Polish surname Pryszczyk) and the derivational suffix -ina 'belonging to X and his kin'. The name is most likely a patronymic of the personal name *Prišь, preserved as a surname in Sorbian Priš, and Polish Przybysz, a hypocoristic of the Slavic personal name Pribyslavъ. According to Aleksandar Loma, Snoj's etymology would presuppose a rare and relatively late word formation process. According to Loma, the name of the city could be derived from the Proto-Slavic dialectal word *pryščina, meaning "spring (of water)", which is also attested in the Moravian dialects of Czech; it is derived from the verb *pryskati, meaning "to splash" or "to spray" (prskati in modern Serbian). The inhabitants of this city call themselves Prishtinali in local Gheg Albanian or Prištevci (Приштевци) in the local Serbian dialect.

History

Early development 

The area of Pristina has been inhabited since the Neolithic era by Early European Farmers after 7,000 BCE in the Balkans: Starčevo followed by its successors Vinča, Baden and lastly Bubanj-Hum. The earliest recognised references were discovered in Gračanica, Matiçan and Ulpiana.

By the early Iron Age, the distinctly Dardanian local variant of the Illyrian Glasinac-Mati culture appears in Kosovo with a particular spread in hilltop settlements. In the area of Pristina, a hilltop settlement appears since the 8th century BCE at an altitude of 685m near the village Teneshdoll, ~16km to the north of the Pristina city center. Pottery finds suggests that the area may have been in use since the Bronze Age. The settlement seems to have maintained long-distance trade contacts as the finding of a skyphos vessel from Aegean Greece suggests.
During the 4th century BC, a Dardanian Kingdom was established in the region. Following the Roman conquest of Illyria in 168 BC, Romans colonized and founded several cities in the region.

Ulpiana was an important Roman city on the Balkan Peninsula and in the 2nd century BC it was declared a municipium. Ulpiana suffered tremendous damage from an earthquake in 518 AD. After the Roman Empire was divided into a western and an eastern half, the area remained within the Byzantine Empire for the following centuries. Emperor Justinian I rebuilt the city in great splendor and renamed it "Justiniana Secunda", although with the arrival of Slavs in the 6th century, the settlement again fell into disrepair. In the middle of the 9th century, it was ceded to the First Bulgarian Empire.

11th to 16th centuries 

In the early 11th century, Pristina fell under Byzantine rule and the area was included into a province called Bulgaria. Between the late 11th and middle of the 13th century it was ceded several times to the Second Bulgarian Empire.

In 1315, the nearby Gračanica monastery was founded by King Stefan Milutin. Stefan Dušan used a location in the area of Pristina as his court before moving eventually to the vicinity of Skopje as he moved his rule southwards. The first historical record mentioning Pristina by its name dates back to 1342 when the Byzantine Emperor John VI Kantakouzenos, on visit to Stefan Dušan at his royal court, described Pristina as a 'village'. During the time of the Kingdom of Serbia in the early 14th century, the main route between the Western Balkans and Constantinople ran through Pristina. Following the Battle of Kosovo, Pristina fell within the realms of the Serbian Despotate under Prince Stefan Lazarević. A bitter feud between Lazarević and Đurađ Branković developed and led to open conflict, with Pristina being the scene of heavy fighting in 1409 and 1410. At the turn of the 15th century during the time of the Serbian Despotate, Pristina was a major trading post for silver, with many traders hailing from the Republic of Ragusa.

Between the end of the 14th and the middle of the 15th century, Ottoman rule was gradually imposed in the town. In the course of the 14th and 15th centuries, Pristina began to develop as a mining and trading center thanks to its proximity to the rich mining town of Novo Brdo, and due to its position of the Balkan trade routes. The old town stretching out between the Vellusha and Prishtevka rivers which are both covered over today, became an important crafts and trade center. Pristina was famous for its annual trade fairs (Panair) and its goat hide and goat hair articles. Around 50 different crafts were practiced from tanning to leather dying, belt making and silk weaving, as well as crafts related to the military – armorers, smiths, and saddle makers. As early as 1485, Pristina artisans also started producing gunpowder. Trade was thriving and there was a growing colony of Ragusan traders (from modern day Dubrovnik) providing the link between Pristina's craftsmen and the outside world. In 1455 Pristina had a significant Muslim Albanian population. The settlement at the time had about 300 households. About 3/4 were Christian and 1/4 Muslim. In the 15th century the toponym Arnaut was recorded in the town, which indicates an Albanian presence. The first mosque was constructed in the late 14th century while under Serbian rule. The 1487 defter recorded 412 Christian and 94 Muslim households in Pristina, which at the time was administratively part of the Sanjak of Vučitrn.

In the early Ottoman era, Islam was an urban phenomenon and only spread slowly with increasing urbanization. The travel writer Evliya Çelebi, visiting Pristina in the 1660s was impressed with its fine gardens and vineyards. In those years, Pristina was part of the Vıçıtırın Sanjak and its 2,000 families enjoyed the peace and stability of the Ottoman era. Economic life was controlled by the guild system (esnafs) with the tanners' and bakers' guild controlling prices, limiting unfair competition and acting as banks for their members. Religious life was dominated by religious charitable organizations often building mosques or fountains and providing charity to the poor.

17th to 20th centuries 

During the Austro-Turkish War in the late 17th century, Pristina citizens under the leadership of the Catholic Albanian priest Pjetër Bogdani pledged loyalty to the Austrian army and supplied troops. He contributed a force of 6,000 Albanian soldiers to the Austrian army which had arrived in Pristina. Under Austrian occupation, The Fatih Mosque (Mbretit Mosque) was briefly converted to a Jesuit church. Following the Austrian defeat in January 1690, Pristina's inhabitants were left at the mercy of Ottoman and Tatar troops who took revenge against the local population as punishment for their co-operation with the Austrians. A French officer traveling to Pristina noted soon afterwards that "Pristina looked impressive from a distance but close up it is a mass of muddy streets and houses made of earth".

The year 1874 marked a turning point. That year the railway between Salonika and Mitrovica started operations and the seat of the vilayet of Prizren was relocated to Pristina. This privileged position as capital of the Ottoman vilayet lasted only for a short while. from January until August 1912, Pristina was liberated from Ottoman rule by Albanian rebel forces led by Hasan Prishtina. However, The Kingdom of Serbia opposed the plan for a Greater Albania, preferring a partition of the European territory of the Ottoman Empire among the four Balkan allies. On October 22, 1912, Serb forces took Pristina. However, Bulgaria, dissatisfied with its share of the first Balkan War, occupied Kosovo in 1915 and took Pristina under Bulgarian occupation.

During the Massacres of Albanians in the Balkan Wars, Pristina suffered many atrocities; the Serbian army entered Pristina on 22 October. Albanian and Turkish households were looted and destroyed, and women and children were killed. A Danish journalist based in Skopje reported that the Serbian campaign in Pristina "had taken on the character of a horrific massacring of the Albanian population". An estimated 5,000 people in Pristina were murder in the early days of the Serbian occupation. The events have been interpreted as an early attempt to change the region's demographics. Serbian settlers were brought into the city, and Serbian Prime Minister Nikola Pašić bought  of land. Pristinans who wore a plis were targeted by the Serbian army; those who wore the Turkish fez were safe, and the price of a fez rose steeply.

In late October 1918, the 11th French colonial division took over Pristina and returned Pristina back to what then became the 'First Yugoslavia' on the 1st of December 1918. In September 1920, the decree of the colonization of the new southern lands' facilitated the takeover by Serb colonists of large Ottoman estates in Pristina and land seized from Albanians. The interwar period saw the first exodus of Albanian and Turkish speaking population. From 1929 to 1941, Priština was part of the Vardar Banovina of the Kingdom of Yugoslavia.

On 17 April 1941, Yugoslavia surrendered unconditionally to axis forces. On 29 June, Benito Mussolini proclaimed a greater Albania, with most of Kosovo under Italian occupation united with Albania. There ensued mass killings of Serbs, in particular colonists, and an exodus of tens of thousands of Serbs. After the capitulation of Italy, Nazi Germany took control of the city. In May 1944, 281 local Jews were arrested by units of the 21st Waffen Mountain Division of the SS Skanderbeg (1st Albanian), which was made up mostly of Muslim Albanians. The Jews were later deported to Germany, where many were killed. The few surviving Jewish families in Pristina eventually left for Israel in 1949. As a result of World War II and forced migration, Pristina's population dropped to 9,631 inhabitants.

The communist decision to make Pristina the capital of Kosovo in 1947 ushered a period of rapid development and outright destruction. The Yugoslav communist slogan at the time was uništi stari graditi novi (destroy the old, build the new). In a misguided effort to modernize the town, communists set out to destroy the Ottoman bazaar and large parts of the historic center, including mosques, catholic churches and Ottoman houses. A second agreement signed between Yugoslavia and Turkey in 1953 led to the exodus of several hundreds more Albanian families from Pristina. They left behind their homes, properties and businesses. However, this policy changed under the new constitution ratified in 1974. Few of the Ottoman town houses survived the communists' modernization drive, with the exception of those that were nationalized like today's Emin Gjiku Museum or the building of the Institute for the Protection of Monuments.

As capital city and seat of the government, Pristina creamed off a large share of Yugoslav development funds channeled into Kosovo. As a result, the city's population and its economy changed rapidly. In 1966, Pristina had few paved roads, the old town houses had running water and cholera was still a problem. Prizren continued to be the largest town in Kosovo. Massive investments in state institutions like the newly founded University of Pristina, the construction of new high-rise socialist apartment blocks and a new industrial zone on the outskirts of Pristina attracted large number of internal migrants. This ended a long period when the institution had been run as an outpost of Belgrade University and gave a major boost to Albanian-language education and culture in Kosovo. The Albanians were also allowed to use the Albanian flag.

Within a decade, Pristina nearly doubled its population from about 69,514 in 1971 to 109,208 in 1981. This golden age of externally financed rapid growth was cut short by Yugoslavia's economic collapse and the 1981 student revolts. Pristina, like the rest of Kosovo slid into a deepening economic and social crisis. The year 1989 saw the revocation of Kosovo's autonomy under Milošević, the rise of Serb nationalism and mass dismissal of ethnic Albanians.

Kosovo War 

Following the reduction of Kosovo's autonomy by former Serbian President Slobodan Milošević in 1989, a harshly repressive regime was imposed throughout Kosovo by the Yugoslav government with Albanians largely being purged from state industries and institutions. The LDK's role meant, that when the Kosovo Liberation Army began to attack Serbian and Yugoslav forces from 1996 onwards, Pristina remained largely calm until the outbreak of the Kosovo War in March 1999. Pristina was spared large scale destruction compared to towns like Gjakova or Peja that suffered heavily at the hands of Serbian forces. For their strategic importance, however, a number of military targets were hit in Pristina during NATO's aerial campaign, including the post office, police headquarters and army barracks, today's Adem Jashari garrison on the road to Kosovo Polje.

Widespread violence broke out in Pristina. Serbian and Yugoslav forces shelled several districts and, in conjunction with paramilitaries, conducted large-scale expulsions of ethnic Albanians accompanied by widespread looting and destruction of Albanian properties. Many of those expelled were directed onto trains apparently brought to Pristina's main station for the express purpose of deporting them to the border of North Macedonia, where they were forced into exile.

The majority Albanian population fled Pristina in large numbers to escape Serb policy and paramilitary units. The first NATO troops to enter the city in early June 1999 were Norwegian special forces from FSK Forsvarets Spesialkommando and soldiers from the British Special Air Service 22 S.A.S, although to NATO's diplomatic embarrassment Russian troops arrived first at the airport. Apartments were occupied illegally and the Roma quarters behind the city park was torched. Several strategic targets in Pristina were attacked by NATO during the war, but serious physical damage appears to have largely been restricted to a few specific neighbourhoods shelled by Yugoslav security forces. At the end of the war the Serbs became victims of violence committed by Kosovo Albanian extremists. On numerous occasions Serbs were killed by mobs of Kosovo Albanian extremists for merely speaking Serbian in public or being identified as a Serb. Violence reached its pinnacle in 2004 when Kosovo Albanian extremists were moving from apartment block to apartment block attacking and ransacking the residences of remaining Serbs. A majority of the city's 45,000 Serb inhabitants fled from Kosovo and today only several dozen remain in the city.

As a capital city and seat of the UN administration (UNMIK), Pristina has benefited greatly from a high concentration of international staff with disposable income and international organizations with sizable budgets. The injection of reconstruction funds from donors, international organizations and the Albanian diaspora has fueled an unrivaled, yet short-lived, economic boom. A plethora of new cafes, restaurants and private businesses opened to cater for new (and international) demand with the beginning of a new era for Pristina.

21st century 

Pristina International Airport's new terminal opened for operations in October 2013, which was built in response to a growing demand for air travel in Kosovo. In November of the same year, the R7 motorway as part of the Albania-Kosovo motorway, linking Pristina and the Albanian city of Durrës on the Albanian Adriatic Sea Coast, was completed. Another extensive development for the city has been the completion of the R6 motorway in 2019, connecting Pristina to the Macedonian city of Skopje.

Geography 

Pristina is situated on a alluvial plain in the regions of Llap and Kosovo across the Goljak Hills in central and eastern Kosovo. Bodies of water in Pristina Municipality include the lakes of Gračanica and Batlava as well as the rivers of Lab, Prishtevka and Vellusha. The park of Germia lies in the east of Pristina and extends in the north of the villages of Llukar and Kolovica to the south at Badovac.

Pristina is one of the urban areas with the most severe water shortages in Kosovo. Its population have to cope with daily water curbs due to the lack of rain and snowfall, which has left Pristina's water supplies in a dreadful condition. The water supply comes from the two main reservoirs of Batlava and Gračanica. However, there are many problems with the water supply that comes from these two reservoirs which supply 92% of Pristina's population. As such, the authorities have increased their efforts to remedy the situation and to make sure that such crises do not hit the city again.

Climate 

Pristina has a moderate climate with an average of 2909.69 hours of sunshine annually. July is the sunniest month of the year with an average of about 11.5 hours of sunshine a day and by contrast, the average hours of sunshine are less than 4.5 hours per day in January.

Politics 

Pristina is the capital city of Kosovo and plays an instrumental role in shaping the political and economic life of the country. It is the location of the Parliament of Kosovo headquartered at the Mother Teresa Square and the official residence and workplace of the President and Prime Minister of Kosovo. Pristina is also home to Kosovo's Constitutional Court, Supreme Court and Appeal Court as well as the Basic Court of Pristina.

Pristina is a municipality governed by a mayor–council system with the mayor of Pristina and the members of the Pristina Municipal Council responsible for the administration of Pristina Municipality. The municipality is encompassed in Pristina District and consists of 43 adjacent settlements with Pristina as its seat. The mayor of Pristina is elected by the people to act as the chief executive officer of Pristina Municipality. The Pristina Municipal Council is the legislative arm of the municipality and is also a democratically elected institution, comprising 51 councillors since the latest municipal election.

International relations 

Pristina is a founding member of the Union of Albanian Municipalities in the Region. It is twinned with Ankara, Bursa, Des Moines, Namur and has a partnership agreement with Zagreb.

Economy 

Pristina constitutes the heart of the economy of Kosovo and of vital importance to the country's stability. The tertiary sector is the most important for the economy of the city and employs more than 75% of work force of Pristina. 20% of the working population makes up the secondary sector followed by the primary sector with only 5%.

Pristina is the primary tourist destination in Kosovo as well as the main air gateway to the country. It is known as a university center of students from neighbouring countries as Albania, North Macedonia, Montenegro and Serbia.
In 2012, Tourism in Pristina attracted around 100,000 foreign visitors. which represents 74.2% Most foreign tourists come from Albania, Turkey, Germany, United States, Slovenia, Montenegro, North Macedonia, with the number of visitors from elsewhere growing every year.

The city has a large number of luxury hotels, modern restaurants, bars, pubs and very large nightclubs. Coffee bars are a representative icon of Pristina and they can be found almost everywhere. The largest hotels of the city are the Swiss Diamond and the Grand Hotel Prishtina situated in the heart of the city. Other major hotels present in Pristina include the Emerald Hotel, Sirius Hotel and Hotel Garden.

Some of the most visited sights near the city include the Batlava Lake and Marble Cave, which are also among the most visited places in country. Pristina has played a very important role during the World War II, being a shelter for Jews, whose cemeteries now can be visited.

Infrastructure

Transport 

Pristina constitutes the economic and financial heart of Kosovo, in part due to its high population, modern infrastructure and geographical location in the center of the country. Following the independence of Kosovo, the city has undergone significant improvements and developments vastly modernising and expanding the economy, infrastructure and most notably transportation by air, rail and road.

Pristina is the most important and frequent road junction of Kosovo as all of the major expressways and motorways passes through the city limits. Most of the motorways of Kosovo are largely completed and partially under construction or under planning process. Immediately after completion, Pristina will provide direct access to Skopje through the R6 motorway. The R7 motorway significantly connects Durrës with Prishtina and will have near future a direct connection to the Pan-European corridor X.

Pristina International Airport serves as the premier gateway to the country and carries almost 2 million passengers per year with connections to many destinations around different countries and cities of Europe with the most frequent routes to Austria, Germany, Switzerland as well as to Slovenia, Turkey and the United Kingdom.

Pristina is the transport hub of road, rail and air in Kosovo. The city's buses, trains and planes together all serve to maintain a high level of connectivity between Pristina many different districts and beyond. Analysis from the Traffic Police have shown that, of 240,000 cars registered in Kosovo, around 100,000 (41%) are from the region of Pristina.  The Pristina railway station is located near the city centre.

Pristina effectively has two train stations. Pristina railway station lies west of the center, while Fushë Kosovë railway station is Kosovo's railway hub.
Pristina is serviced by a train that travels through Pristina to Skopje daily. The station is located in the industrial section of Pristina.

Education 

Pristina is the center of education in the country and home to many public and private primary and secondary schools, colleges, academies and universities, located in different areas across the city. The University of Pristina is the largest and oldest university of the city and was established in the 20th century.

Finance, arts, journalism, medicine, dentistry, pharmaceuticals, veterinary programs, and engineering are among the most popular fields for foreigners to undertake in the city.
This brings a many of young students from other cities and countries to Pristina. It is known for its many educational institutions such as University of Pristina, University of Pristina Faculty of Arts and the Academy of Sciences and Arts of Kosovo.

Among the first schools known in the city were those opened during the Ottoman period. Albanians were allowed to attend these schools, most of which were religious, with only few of them being secular.

The city has numerous libraries, many of which contain vast collections of historic and cultural documents. The most important library in terms of historic document collections is the National Library of Kosovo.

Media 

Media in Pristina include some of the most important newspapers, largest publishing houses and most prolific television studios of Kosovo. Pristina is the largest communications center of media in Kosovo. Almost all of the major media organizations in Kosovo are based in Pristina. The television industry developed in Pristina and is a significant employer in the city's economy. The four major broadcast networks, RTK, RTV21, KTV and KLAN KOSOVA are all headquartered in Pristina.
Radio Television of Kosovo (RTK) is the only public broadcaster both in Pristina and in all of Kosovo as well, who continues to be financed directly by the state. All of the daily newspapers in Pristina have a readership throughout Kosovo.
 An important event which affected the development of the media, is that in University of Pristina since 2005 is established the Journalism Faculty within the Faculty of Philology in which are registered a large number of youth people.

Demography 

According to the Kosovo Agency of Statistics (KAS) estimate from the 2011 census, there were 198,897 people residing in Pristina Municipality, representing the most populous city and municipality of Kosovo. The urban population of Pristina Municipality was approximately  160,000, while the rural population was around 37,000. With a population density of 380,3 people per square kilometre, Pristina is the third most densely populated municipality of Kosovo.

In terms of ethnicity, Pristina Municipality was 97.77% Albanian, 1.08% Turkish, 0.28% Ashkali, 0.22% Serbian, 0.2% Bosniak, 0.1% Gorani and 0.03% Romani. By language, 98.09% spoke Albanian as a first language. Other spoken languages in Pristina Municipality were Turkish (1.04%), Serbian (0.25%) and Romani (0.03%). By religion, there were 193,474 (97.27%) Muslims, 1,170 (0.59%) Roman Catholics, 480 (0.24%) Orthodox, 344 (0.17%) of other religions and 660 (0.33%) irreligious.

Kosovo is a secular state with no state religion. The freedom of belief, conscience and religion is explicitly guaranteed in the Constitution of Kosovo. Islam and Christianity are the most widely practiced religions among the people of Pristina. The remaining 1.9% of the population reported having no religion, or another religion, or did not provide an adequate answer. Pristina has centres of worship for a multitude of faiths for its population. The Cathedral of Pristina is perhaps the largest cathedral in Kosovo and is named in honour of the Albanian Roman Catholic nun and missionary, Mother Teresa. Some of the mosques of Pristina, among others the Imperial Mosque and Çarshi Mosque, are centuries old and were built during the Middle Ages by the Ottomans.

Culture 

As the capital city of the Republic of Kosovo, it is the center of cultural and artistic development of all Albanians that live in Kosovo. Pristina is home to the largest cultural institutions of the country, such as the National Theatre of Kosovo, National Archaeology, Ethnography and Natural science Museum, National Art Gallery and the Ethnological Museum. The National Library of Kosovo has than 1.8 million books, periodicals, maps, atlases, microfilms and other library materials.

There are many foreign cultural institutions in Pristina, including the Albanian Albanological Institute,
the French Alliance Française, the British Council,
and the German Goethe-Institut and Friedrich Ebert Foundation.
The Information Office of the Council of Europe was also established in Pristina.

Of 426 protected historical monuments in Kosovo, 21 are in Pristina.
A large number of these monuments date back to the Byzantine and Ottoman periods.

Starting in 1945, the Yugoslav authorities began constructing a modern Pristina with the idea of "destroy the old, build the new". This modernization led to major changes in the structure of the buildings, their function and their surrounding environment.

However, numerous types of monuments have been preserved, including four mosques, a restored orthodox church, an Ottoman bath, a public fountain, a clock tower, several traditional houses as well as European-influenced architecture buildings such as Kosovo Museum. These symbolize the historical and cultural character of Pristina as it was developed throughout centuries in the spirit of conquering empires (Roman, Byzantine, Ottoman and Austro-Hungarian).

The Hivzi Sylejmani library was founded 70 years ago and it is one of the largest libraries regarding the number of books in its inventory which is nearly 100.000. All of those books are in service for the library's registered readers.

The Mbretëresha e Dardanisë (Queen of Dardania) or Hyjnesha ne Fron (The Goddess on the Throne) is an artifact that was found during some excavations in 1955 in the area of Ulpiana, a suburb of Pristina. It dates back to 3500 BC in the Neolithic Era and it is made of clay. In Pristina there is also "Hamami i Qytetit"(The City Bath) and the house of Emin Gjika which has been transformed to the Ethnographic Museum. Pristina also has its municipal archive which was established in the 1950s and holds all the records of the city, municipality and the region.

Music

Albanian music is considered to be very rich in genres and their development. But before talking about genre development, a key point that has to be mentioned is without doubt the rich folklore of Kosovo most of which unfortunately has not been digitalized and saved in archives. The importance of folklore is reflected in two main keys, it is considered a treasure" of cultural heritage of our country and it helps to enlighten the Albanian history of that time, and the importance of that is of a high level especially when mentioning the circumstances of our territory in that time.
Folklore has also served as inspiration and influence in many fields including music composition in the next generations
One of the most notable and very first composers, Rexho Mulliqi in whose work, folklore inspiration and influence is very present.

When highlighting the music creativity and its starts in Kosovo and the relation between it and the music creativity in Albania even though they have had their development in different circumstances, it is proved that they share some characteristics in a very natural way. This fact shows that they belong to one "Cultural Tree".

Some of few international music artists of Albanian heritage are born and raised in the city including Rita Ora, Dua Lipa and Era Istrefi.

Theater 

The city of Pristina hosts only three active theatres such as the National Theater, Oda and Dodona Theatre placed in center of Pristina. They offers live performances every week. The National Theatre is placed in the middle downtown of the city, near the main government building and was founded in 1946. ODA Theatre is situated in the Youth Centre Building and Dodona Theatre is placed in Vellusha district, which is near Ibrahim Rugova Square.

The National Theater of Kosovo is the highest ranked theater institution in the country which has the largest number of productions. The theater is the only public theater in Kosovo and therefore it is financed by Ministry of Culture, Youth and Sport. This theater has produced more than 400 premieres which have been watched by more than 3 million spectators.

Festivals 

The Prishtina International Film Festival screens prominent international cinema productions in the Balkan region and beyond, and draws attention to the Kosovar film industry. It was created after the 2008 Kosovo declaration of independence. After its independence in 2008, Kosovo looked for ways to promote its cultural and artistic image.

One of major festivals include the Chopin Piano Fest Pristina that was established for the first time on the occasion of the 200th birth anniversary of Frédéric Chopin in 2010 by the Kosovo Chopin Association. The festival is becoming a traditional piano festival held in spring every year. It is considered to be a national treasure. In its 5 years of formation it has offered interpretations by both world-famous pianists such as Peter Donohoe, Janina Fialkowska, Kosovo-Albanian musicians of international renown like Ardita Statovci, Alberta Troni and local talents. The Festival strives to promote the art of interpretation, the proper value of music and the technicalities that accompany it. The Festival has served as inspiration for the formation of other music festivals like Remusica and Kamerfest.

The DAM Festival Pristina is one of the most prominent cultural events taking place in the capital. It is an annual music festival which gathers young and talented national and international musicians from all over the world. This festival works on enriching the Kosovar cultural scene with the collision of the traditional and the contemporary. The festival was founded by musician Dardan Selimaj.

Sports 

Pristina is the center of sport in Kosovo, where activity is organized across amateur and professional levels, sport organizations and clubs, regulated by the Kosovo Olympic Committee and the Ministry of Culture, Youth and Sport. Sport is organized in units called Municipal Leagues. There are seven Municipal Leagues in Pristina. The Football Municipal consists of 18 clubs, the Basketball Municipal 5 clubs, the Handball Municipal 2 clubs, Table Tennis and Chess 6 clubs each, the Karate Municipal 15 and the Tennis Municipal 2 clubs.

Football is the most popular sport in the city. It is represented by FC Prishtina, which plays their home games in the Fadil Vokrri Stadium. Basketball has been also one of the most popular sports in Pristina and is represented by KB Prishtina. It is the most successful basketball club in Kosovo and is part of the Balkan League. Joining it in the Superleague is another team from Pristina, RTV 21.

Streetball is a traditionally organised sport and cultural event at the Germia Park since 2000. Apart from indoor basketball success, Che Bar team has been crowned the champion of the national championship in 2013. This victory coincided with Streetball Kosovo's acceptance in FIBA. Handball is also very popular. Pristina's representatives are recognised internationally and play international matches.

See also 
 List of people from Pristina

Explanatory notes

References

External links 

 Municipality of PristinaOfficial Website
 

 
Pristina
Populated places in Pristina District
Capitals in Europe
Gegëri
Illyrian Kosovo
Dardanians
Starčevo–Körös–Criș culture